Ziama Mansouriah is a district in Jijel Province, Algeria. It was named after its capital, Ziama Mansouriah.

Municipalities
The district is further divided into 2 municipalities:
Ziama Mansouriah
Eraguene